Thomas Calder may refer to:

Thomas Calder of the Calder baronets
Tom Calder, footballer

See also
Calder (surname)